Browns Mills Junction is an unincorporated community located within Pemberton Township in Burlington County, New Jersey, United States. It was the site of a train station named Browns Mills in-the-Pines where a short branch connected the main line to Browns Mills. The settlement features a few houses along Junction Road and Mount Misery Road (also a part of CR 645 west of Junction Road) but is otherwise very forested as a part of the New Jersey Pine Barrens.

References

Pemberton Township, New Jersey
Unincorporated communities in Burlington County, New Jersey
Unincorporated communities in New Jersey